Ramón Rodríguez Verdejo (born 20 September 1968), commonly known as Monchi, is a Spanish retired footballer who played as a goalkeeper, currently director of football of Sevilla FC.

Playing career
Born in San Fernando, Cádiz, Andalusia, Monchi graduated from Sevilla FC's youth system. He made his senior debut with the reserves in the 1988–89 season, in Segunda División B.

In the summer of 1990, Monchi was promoted to the main squad in La Liga. He first appeared in the competition on 13 January 1991, starting in a 1–1 away draw against Real Sociedad.

Monchi spent the vast majority of his career as a backup to Juan Carlos Unzué, only featuring more regularly from 1995 onwards. He played a career-best 26 matches in 1996–97, as the campaign ended in relegation.

Monchi retired in 1999 aged only 30, after contributing 20 games – playoffs included – to his team's promotion.

Sporting director
In 2000, after Sevilla were relegated from the top division, Monchi was appointed their director of football. He was given two objectives by the board: develop the club's youth system and implement a vast scouting policy inside and outside Spain.

Monchi helped discover Diego Capel, Alberto Moreno, Jesús Navas, Antonio Puerta, Sergio Ramos and José Antonio Reyes, and he also created a network of over 700 scouts around the world. Within this setup, he sourced a number of profitable bargains (including Adriano, Dani Alves, Júlio Baptista, Federico Fazio, Seydou Keita and Ivan Rakitić), making a profit of around €200 million in the transfer market, as the club established itself in the top half of the top division in his 16 years there.

Monchi asked to leave Sevilla in the 2016 off-season, but the board did not accept his request unless he paid his €5 million buyout clause. He left in April 2017, having helped win 11 trophies during his tenure. Later that month, he signed a four-year contract in the same role with A.S. Roma in Italy's Serie A.

On 17 March 2019, Monchi confirmed that he would be returning to Sevilla as sporting director the following month.

See also
List of one-club men

References

External links

1968 births
Living people
People from San Fernando, Cádiz
Sportspeople from the Province of Cádiz
Spanish footballers
Footballers from Andalusia
Association football goalkeepers
La Liga players
Segunda División players
Segunda División B players
Sevilla Atlético players
Sevilla FC players
Sevilla FC non-playing staff
A.S. Roma non-playing staff
Spanish expatriate sportspeople in Italy